Ali Chini (born 10 July 1976) is a former Iranian football player and a current coach. He was assistant coach of Esteghlal

Club career
He previously played for the Payam Mashhad from 1996–1998 and Esteghlal from 1998–2000.

References

Iranian footballers
Esteghlal F.C. players
Payam Mashhad players
1976 births
Living people
Association football midfielders